is damaging information about a politician, a businessperson, or other public figure, which may be used to create negative publicity, as well as for blackmail, often to exert influence rather than monetary gain, and extortion. Kompromat may be acquired from various security services, or outright forged, and then publicized by use of a public relations official. 

The word kompromat comes from Russian (short for  "compromising material"). Widespread use of  has been one of the characteristic features of the politics of Russia and other post-Soviet states.

Etymology 
The term  is a borrowing of the Russian KGB slang term  from the Stalin era, which is short for "compromising material". It refers to disparaging information that can be collected, stored, traded, or used strategically across all domains: political, electoral, legal, professional, judicial, media, and business. The origins of the term in Russian trace back to 1930s secret police jargon.

Techniques 
In the early days,  featured doctored photographs, planted drugs, grainy videos of liaisons with prostitutes hired by the KGB, and a wide range of other primitive entrapment techniques.  More contemporary forms of  appear as a form of cybercrime. One aspect of  that stands the test of time is that the compromising information is often sexual in nature.

Use 
 is part of the political culture in Russia, with many members of the business and political elite having collected and stored potentially compromising material on their political opponents.  does not necessarily target individuals or groups, but rather collects information that could be useful at a later time. Compromising videos are often produced long in advance of when leverage over people is needed.

Opposition research is conducted in the U.S. to find compromising material on political opponents so that such material may be released to weaken those opponents. Some contend that  differs from opposition research, in that such information is used to exert influence over people rather than to simply win elections. Nevertheless, compromising material uncovered by opposition research need not be used in only legal or ethical ways. It can be used to exert influence over Western leaders just as surely as it can be used to exert influence over Russian leaders.

History 
In the 1950s, British civil servant John Vassall was a victim of a gay honey trap operation,  producing  which could be used against him since homosexuality was illegal in Britain at the time. During a 1957 visit to Moscow, American journalist Joseph Alsop also fell victim to a gay honey trap operation conducted by the KGB.

In 1997, Valentin Kovalyov was removed as the Russian Minister of Justice after photographs of him with prostitutes in a sauna controlled by the Solntsevskaya Bratva crime organization were published in a newspaper. In 1999, a video aired with a man resembling Yury Skuratov in bed with two women that later would lead to his dismissal as Prosecutor General of Russia. It was released after he began looking into charges of corruption by President Boris Yeltsin and his associates.

In April 2010, politician Ilya Yashin and comedian Victor Shenderovich were involved in a sex scandal with a woman claimed to have acted as a Kremlin honey trap to discredit opposition figures. The video was released only two days before the wedding of Shenderovich's daughter.

In cases of  during the early 21st century, Russian operatives have been suspected or accused of placing child pornography on the personal computers of individuals they were attempting to discredit. In 2015, the UK's Crown Prosecution Service announced that it would prosecute Vladimir Bukovsky for "prohibited images" found on his computer; however, the case against Bukovsky was put on hold as investigators tried to determine whether the pornographic images were planted. Bukovsky died in October 2019.

Ahead of the 2016 Russian legislative election, a sex tape of Mikhail Kasyanov emerged on NTV.

During the 2016 U.S. presidential election, U.S. intelligence agencies were investigating possibly compromising personal and financial information on President-elect Donald Trump, leading to allegations that he and members of his administration may be vulnerable to manipulation by the Russian government.

British Labour Party MP Chris Bryant, an ex-chair of the all-party parliamentary group for Russia, who claims that the Russian government orchestrated a homophobic campaign to remove him from this position, has claimed that the Russian government has acquired  on high-profile Conservative Party MPs including Boris Johnson, Liam Fox, Alan Duncan, and David Davis.

Following a 2016 phone call between incoming-U.S. National Security Adviser Michael Flynn and Russian ambassador Sergey Kislyak, Flynn allegedly lied to the White House on the extent of those contacts placing him in a position vulnerable to blackmail. According to congressional testimony delivered by former Acting U.S. Attorney General Sally Yates, the Department of Justice believed that "General Flynn was compromised," and placed Flynn in “a situation where the national-security adviser essentially could be blackmailed by the Russians.”

See also 
 Active measures
 John O Brennan
 Character assassination
 Cyberwarfare
 Defamation
 Discrediting tactic
 False evidence
 Eric H. Holder
 Ibiza affair
 Jeffrey Epstein
 Negative campaigning
 Opposition research
 Smear campaign
 Steele dossier
 Christopher A. Wray

References

External links 
 Компромат.Ru (Russian website)
 Компромат.Ua (Ukrainian website)

Public relations
Politics of Russia
Political controversies in Russia
Russian words and phrases
Politics of Ukraine
Political controversies in Ukraine
Election campaigning
Blackmail
Surveillance
Defamation